The Constable of France (from Latin  for 'count of the stables') was lieutenant to the King of France, the first of the original five Great Officers of the Crown (along with seneschal, chamberlain, butler, and chancellor) and the commander-in-chief of the Royal Army. He was, at least on paper, the highest-ranking member of the French nobility.

The  was also responsible for military justice and served to regulate the Chivalry. His jurisdiction was called the Constabulary (or in modern French orthography which sticks closer to the correct pronunciation).

The office was established by King Philip I in 1060 AD, with Alberic becoming the first Constable.

The position was officially replaced by the purely ceremonial title "Dean of Marshals", who was in fact the most senior "Marshal of France"; as the word  is used in French mainly in the sense of "the eldest".

The later title Marshal General of France or more precisely "Marshal General of the King's camps and armies" was bestowed on the most outstanding military leaders.

Badge of office

The badge of office was a highly elaborate sword called Joyeuse, after the legendary sword of Charlemagne. Joyeuse was a sword made with fragments of different swords and used in the Sacre of the French Kings since at least 1271. It was contained in a blue scabbard embellished with royal symbol, the fleur-de-lis, in column order from hilt to point. Traditionally, the constable was presented with the sword on taking his office by the King himself.

Authority
After the abolition of the office of Sénéchal in 1191, the Connétable became the most important officer in the army, and as First Officer of the Crown, he ranked in ceremonial precedence immediately after the peers.  He had the position of Lieutenant-general of the King within the kingdom.  The constable had under his command all military officers, including the powerful maréchaux; he was also responsible for the financing of the army, and administering military justice. The official name of the jurisdiction was la connétablie (the constabulary), which he exercised with the assistance of the Maréchaux de France (Marshals of France). This paralleled the Court of the Lord Constable, later called curia militaris of Court of Chivalry, which existed in England at that time.

Persons subordinate to the Constable of France

Marshal of France (Maréchal de France). However, during exceptional times the Marshal of France could be senior to the Constable, depending on the decisions of the King
Colonel-general – a special category of general in the Royal French army, commanding all the regiments of the same branch of service (i.e. Cavalry, Dragoons, Infantry et al.)
General
Lieutenant-general – the highest regular general officer rank of the French army to which a career army officer could be promoted on the basis of seniority and merit, and not noble blood
Maréchal de camp (literally (Military) Camp Marshal), not to be confused with Field Marshal) – the lowest general officer rank, in later times renamed Major-général and equivalent to the present-day général de brigade (brigadier-general)
Porte-Oriflamme – a prestigious honorary position, not an army rank, which gave the right to carry the King's royal banner (called Oriflamme) into battle
Grand Master of Crossbowmen (Grand-Maître des Arbalétriers du Roi) who was in charge of all archers in the army
Grand Master of Artillery (Grand-Maître de l'Artillerie royale). From the beginning of the 17th century, the Grand Master of the Artillery became a Great Officer of the Crown an immediate subordinate of the King and was no longer under the command of the Constable.

NOT UNDER THE AUTHORITY OF THE CONSTABLE:

 The title "Lieutenant-general of the Realm" (Lieutenant général du royaume) was not a military rank, but a royal appointment.  It was bestowed by the King of France during times of crisis (civil war, a severe illness of the King, war with other realms such as England etc.) on a royal prince of the blood of his choice; who thus became the Commanding general of the entire kingdom, in effect, with supreme command over the civil service, the army and even the Connétable de France, until the moment the King chose to take back the supreme authority in his own hands.

Constables of France
Note that there are gaps in the dates as the position was not always filled following the demise of its occupant.

Constables of the Kings of France
The Capétien Dynasty
Baldric de Dreux, 20 May 1043–1069
Walter (Baldric's deputy), 1048
Alberic (Baldric's deputy), 1060
Gauthier, 1069–1071
Adelelme, 1071–1075
Adam le Isle, 1075–1085
Thibaut, Seigneur de Montmorency, 1085–1107
Gaston de Chanmont, 1107–1108
Hugues le Borgne  de Chanmont, 1108–1135
Mathieu de Montmorency (died 1160), 1138–?
Simon de Neauphle-le-Chateau, 1165–?
Raoul I de Clermont (died 1191), 1174–1191
Dreux IV de Mello (1148–1218), 1194–1218
Mathieu II le Grand, Baron de Montmorency (died 1231), 1218–1231
Amaury de Montfort (died 1241), 1231–1240
Humbert V de Beaujeu (died 1250), 1240–1250
Gilles de Trasignies (died 1276), 1250–1276
Humbert VI de Beaujeu (died 1285), 1277
Raoul II de Clermont (died 1302), 1277–1302
Gaucher V de Châtillon (1249–1329), 1307–1329
The Valois Dynasty
Raoul I of Brienne, Count of Eu and Guînes (d. 1344), 1329–1344
Raoul II of Brienne, Count of Eu and Guînes (died 1350), 1344–1350
Charles de la Cerda (died 1354), 1350–1354
Jacques de Bourbon, Count of La Marche, (1319–1362) 1354–1356
Walter VI of Brienne (c. 1304–1356), 1356
Robert Moreau de Fiennes (1308–1372), 1356–1370
Bertrand du Guesclin (1320–1380), 1370–1380
Olivier V de Clisson (1336–1407), 1380–1392
Philip of Artois, Count of Eu (1358–1397), 1392–1397
Louis de Sancerre (1341–1402), 1397–1402
Charles d'Albret, Comte de Dreux (died 1415– Agincourt), 1402–1411
Waleran, Count of Saint Pol (died 1415), 1411–1413
Charles d'Albret, Comte de Dreux (died 1415– Agincourt), 1413–1415
Bernard VII, Count of Armagnac (died 1418), 1415–1418
Charles II, Duke of Lorraine (1365–1431), 1418–1424
Humphrey Stafford, 1st Duke of Buckingham (1430)
John Stewart, 2nd Earl of Buchan (c. 1381–1424), 1424
Arthur III, Duke of Brittany (1393–1458), 1425–?
John Talbot, 1st Earl of Shrewsbury (1384/1390–1453), 1445–1453 (appointed by Henry VI of England in his position as King of France)
Louis de Luxembourg, Count of Saint-Pol (1418–1475), 1465–?
John II, Duke of Bourbon (1426–1488), 1483–1488
The Valois Angoulême Dynasty
Charles III, Duke of Bourbon (1490–1527), 1518–1523
Anne de Montmorency, Grand Maitre de France (1492–1567), 1538–1567
The Bourbons
Henri I de Montmorency (1570–1621), 1593–1621
Charles d'Albert, duc de Luynes (1621), 1621
François de Bonne, duc de Lesdiguières (1543–1626), 1622–1626

First French Empire
During the Consulate regime (1799–1804), the deposed Bourbon dynasty, through the Comte d'Artois, allegedly offered Napoléon Bonaparte, at that time  First Consul of the Republic, the title of "Constable of France" if he would restore the Bourbons as Kings of France. Bonaparte declined the offer. However, in 1808, Emperor Napoléon I (since 1804) did himself appoint the Grand Dignitaries of the French Empire (Grands Dignitaires de l'Empire Français), among them his younger brother Louis Bonaparte, (in 1806 King of Holland by decision of his brother) as Constable, and Marshal of the Empire Louis Alexandre Berthier, the French Army Chief of Staff and Prince of Neuchâtel as Vice-Constable. Both titles were of a purely honorific nature, and disappeared with the Napoleonic regime's fall.

Movies
If I Were King, 1938, with François Villon (played by Ronald Colman), who was appointed by Louis XI, King of France (played by Basil Rathbone) to be Constable of France for one week.

Various versions of Shakespeare's play Henry V depict Constable Charles d'Albret, Comte de Dreux, who was appointed by Charles VI of France and was killed in the Battle of Agincourt (1415). He is played by Leo Genn in the 1944 film, by Richard Easton in the 1989 film, and by Maxime Lefrancois in the 2012 film. In the 1944 film he dies in personal combat with King Henry. In the 1989 film he is depicted as falling from his horse into the mud (historical tradition holds he was drowned in the mud due to the weight of his armour, disabled by having his horse fall on him). In the 2012 film he is shot by a longbowman after stabbing the Duke of York in the back in woodland away from the main battle.

See also
 Constable
 Lord High Constable
 Joan of Arc – believed by some to have been appointed Constable of France by Charles VII

References

External links

Heraldica
French Heraldry site

Military history of France
Offices in the Ancien Régime
Military ranks of France
Military history of the Ancien Régime
Kingdom of France
 
Constables
1627 disestablishments